This is a list of The Young Indiana Jones Chronicles episodes. It was created by George Lucas. Twenty-eight episodes were produced by Lucasfilm in association with Amblin and Paramount Pictures, though four were unaired during the series' original 1992–93 run on ABC. In 1996, some of the remaining episodes were combined and aired as four two-part TV movies on USA. The entire series was edited into twenty-two feature-length films later that year. Twelve of the films were released on VHS in 1999, while the rest were aired on the Fox Family Channel in 2001. All of the films were released on DVD throughout 2007 and 2008.

Series overview

Episodes

Season 1 (1992) 
The Young Indiana Jones Chronicles debuted on ABC on March 4, 1992 with the feature-length episode Young Indiana Jones and the Curse of the Jackal, which served to introduce the character at the two ages he would be portrayed as in the show. The five subsequent episodes in season one were hour-long.

Season 2 (1992–93) 
Season Two began on September 21, 1992, with the episode "Austria, March 1917", and the seventeen subsequent episodes consisted of both new episodes and some episodes originally produced for the first season—each an hour long. Harrison Ford made a guest appearance in the feature-length episode Young Indiana Jones and the Mystery of the Blues. When the show was cancelled, four episodes remained unaired: "Florence, May 1908", "Prague, August 1917", "Palestine, October 1917", and "Transylvania, January 1918". In Australia, "Somme, Early August 1916" and "Germany, Mid-August 1916" originally aired as a two-hour television movie entitled Young Indiana Jones and the Great Escape.

TV films (1994–96) 
Four television films aired on The Family Channel from 1994 to 1996. No "Old Indy" bookend segments were filmed for the television films, although Sean Patrick Flanery bookended Young Indiana Jones: Travels with Father.

International variations 
In some territories, certain episodes were split or combined under different titles.

Film versions 
In 1996, George Lucas hired T.M. Christopher to aid in re-editing the complete series into twenty-two feature-length episodes. The series was also retitled The Adventures of Young Indiana Jones. Each chapter contains two episodes, with most of the chapters arranged in chronological order. The scenes in which an older Indiana Jones reminisces are not included in these versions, bar in "Chapter 20: Mystery of the Blues", which featured Harrison Ford as an older Indiana Jones in 1950.

In 1999, only Chapters 6, 8, 10–13, 15–18, 20, and 22 were released on VHS in the "Complete Adventures of Indiana Jones" along with the re-release of the movie trilogy (credited as Chapters 23: Temple of Doom, 24: Raiders of the Lost Ark, and 25: Last Crusade). The movie trilogy also featured Chapter 18: Treasure of the Peacock's Eye as a bonus tape (Chapter 10: Phantom Train of Doom in the UK). It was promoted with the rest of the episodes set for release later in 2000, but this was canceled.

Additional documentaries 

 

Additionally 90 documentaries were made for the series.

Unproduced episodes 
When the series was cancelled in 1993, a number of episodes Lucas had intended to shoot never went into production.

"Princeton, May 1905" was to involve Indy meeting Paul Robeson for the first time.
"Russia, March 1909" was the basis for part of Young Indiana Jones: Travels with Father.
"Geneva, May 1909"
"Jerusalem, June 1909" was to involve Indy meeting Abner Ravenwood, who is trying to find a "sacred relic"—the Ark on the temple mount. In "Palestine, October 1917", Indy and his comrades suggest that they will be returning to this location by Christmas of 1917.
"Stockholm, December 1909" was to be a homage to Swedish children's novel The Wonderful Adventures of Nils. Indiana Jones said Stockholm was his favorite city in Sweden in the "London, May 1916" episode.
"Melbourne, March 1910" was to involve Indy meeting Harry Houdini and flying in an airplane with him. The events of this episode are mentioned in "Palestine, October 1917".
"Tokyo, April 1910" was to involve a meeting between the young Indy and Prince Hirohito of Japan, the future Emperor Shōwa.
"LeHavre, June 1916" was to involve Indy and Remy in basic training. When Remy is accused of murdering their drill sergeant, Indy defends him. The two also meet Jean Renoir, who teaches them how to fight in battles.
"Flanders, July 1916" was to involve Indy, Remy and Jaques fighting in Flanders. The events of this episode are mentioned in "Trenches of Hell."
"Berlin, Late August 1916" was to be a second-season episode that involved Indy escaping from prison and fleeing to Berlin, and would have been the third part in the Somme/Germany cycle following Indy's capture in Somme, his escape from prison, his escape from Germany itself. He has to decide between returning to the US (since the US isn't at war with Germany yet) or returning to the Belgian Army. He ultimately decides to return to the Belgian army. Indy would have met Sigrid Schultz.
"Moscow, March 1918" was meant as a sequel to "Petrograd, July 1917." It would have involved Indy working with counter-revolutionary groups in order to allow the U.S. to take over.
"Bombay, April 1919" was to involve Indy meeting Gandhi on his way back from his search for the Eye of the Peacock diamond, while Remy is still searching for the diamond. Remy and Indy fight about continuing the treasure search.
"Buenos Aires, June 1919" was to involve Indy being robbed while trying to return to the U.S. where he works as a tutor. He then ends up in South America as a tutor.
"Havana, December 1919" was to involve Indy and his father in Cuba. The episode would have revolved around integration issues and Indy and Henry Sr. seeing a black player outplay Babe Ruth.
"Honduras, December 1920" was to involve Indy meeting Belloq for the first time and the two becoming friends. Belloq steals a crystal skull and sells it.
"Alaska, June 1921" was to involve Indy studying Eskimos, and rushing to deliver medical supplies by dogsled in order to save a village. The events of this episode are foreshadowed in "Travels with Father".
"Brazil, December 1921" was to involve Indy and Belloq in a search for a lost city, and meeting Percy Fawcett.

Notes

References

External links 

Lists of American action television series episodes
Lists of American drama television series episodes
Indiana Jones lists